Pierre Nantel  (born June 10, 1963) is a Canadian politician and a former member of the House of Commons of Canada. First elected in the 2011 federal election as a member of the New Democratic Party (NDP), he succeeded Jean Dorion of the Bloc Québécois in the district of Longueuil—Pierre-Boucher; in the 2015 election, he was reelected in the redistributed riding of Longueuil—Saint-Hubert.

Prior to being elected, Nantel was a researcher and television commentator, including a stint at Radio-Canada television.

On August 16, 2019, the NDP dropped Nantel from its caucus, and as a candidate in the upcoming 2019 Canadian federal election, following revelations that he had been in private talks to run for another political party in the 2019 federal election. Although Nantel had previously been speculated as potentially joining the Bloc Québécois, the reports that sparked his removal from the NDP caucus indicated that he was in talks with the Green Party of Canada. On August 19, 2019, it was announced that Nantel would sit as an independent MP for the rest of his term and would be running under the Green Party banner in the 2019 federal election. He was defeated in the election, placing third behind the Bloc Québécois and Liberal candidates.

Despite having previously run for federalist parties, he announced in 2021 that he would be the Parti Québécois candidate in the then-upcoming by-election in Marie-Victorin. He lost to CAQ candidate Shirley Dorismond on April 11, 2022.

Electoral record

References

External links

Members of the House of Commons of Canada from Quebec
New Democratic Party MPs
Independent MPs in the Canadian House of Commons
People from Longueuil
People from Salaberry-de-Valleyfield
Living people
1963 births
Canadian columnists
Canadian audio engineers
Félix Award winners
Canadian Broadcasting Corporation people
21st-century Canadian politicians
Parti Québécois candidates in Quebec provincial elections